The 1917 Copa de Honor Cousenier was the final match to decide the winner of the Copa de Honor Cousenier, the 12th. edition of the international competition organised by the Argentine and Uruguayan Associations together. The final was contested by Uruguayan Club Nacional de Football and Argentine Racing Club. 

The match was held in Parque Pereira stadium in Montevideo, on April 21, 1918. Nacional beat Racing 3–1, winning its fourth and last Copa Cousenier trophy over five finals contested.

Qualified teams 

Note

Venue

Match details 

|

|}

References

c
c
1918 in Argentine football
1918 in Uruguayan football